Brian Julio Hernandez (born April 13, 1984) is a former American football wide receiver.

College career
Hernandez played at Pima Community College in 2004. He played at the University of Utah. In the two seasons in Utah, he finished with 86 receptions, 1,133 receiving yards and 4 receiving touchdowns. In 2005, 39 receptions, 709 receiving yards and 3 receiving touchdowns. On October 15, 2005, he recorded 7 receptions and 148 receiving yards against San Diego State, but Utah lost 28-19.

Professional career

Green Bay Blizzard
On September 24, 2009, Hernandez was signed by the Green Bay Blizzard.

Las Vegas Locomotives
In 2009, Hernandez signed with the Las Vegas Locomotives. For the 2010 season, he recorded 5 receptions and 55 receiving yards. He helped the Las Vegas Locomotives to win the UFL Championship for the second straight year.

Washington Redskins
On May 6, 2012, Hernandez signed with the Washington Redskins. On July 28, 2012, he was released by the team.

Philadelphia Eagles
On August 11, 2012, Hernandez signed with the Philadelphia Eagles. On September 5, 2012, he was released with an injury settlement.

References

External links
 Just Sports stats
 Utah bio
 Philadelphia Eagles bio

1984 births
Living people
American football wide receivers
Utah Utes football players
Las Vegas Locomotives players
Saskatchewan Roughriders players
Green Bay Blizzard players